Friday Night Blues is the third studio album by American country music singer John Conlee. The album was released in 1980, by MCA Records.

Track listing

Charts

References

1980 albums
John Conlee albums
MCA Records albums